The following list sorts all cities in the Pakistani province of Sindh with a population of more than 50,000 according to the 2017 Census. As of March 15, 2017, 40 cities fulfill this criterion and are listed here. This list refers only to the population of individual cities, municipalities and towns within their defined limits, which does not include other municipalities or suburban areas within urban agglomerations.

List 

   

The following table lists the 40 cities in Sindh with a population of at least 50,000 on March 15, 2017, according to the 2017 Census of Pakistan. A city is displayed in bold if it is a state or federal capital.

See also
List of cities in Pakistan by population
List of cities in Punjab, Pakistan by population
List of cities in Khyber Pakhtunkhwa by population
List of cities in Balochistan by population
List of metropolitan areas in Pakistan

References 

Populated places in Sindh
Sindh